Christopher Omar Dominguez (born November 22, 1986) is an American former professional baseball third baseman, who is the current head baseball coach of the Bellarmine Knights. He played college baseball for the Louisville from 2007 to 2009. He played in Major League Baseball (MLB) for 2 seasons with the San Francisco Giants and Cincinnati Reds.

Amateur career
Dominguez attended Gulliver Prep in Coral Gables, Florida. He was drafted out of high school by the Texas Rangers in the 17th round of the 2005 Major League Baseball Draft, but he did not sign, opting to attend college.

Dominguez attended the University of Louisville, where he played college baseball for the Louisville Cardinals baseball team of the Big East Conference. In 2006, he played summer ball for the Newport Gulls. As a freshman in 2007, Dominguez was named to a First Team College Freshman All-American at designated hitter and Columbia (MO) Regional MVP in the College World Series. In the summer of 2007 he played for the Harwich Mariners of the Cape Cod Baseball League (CCBL).

In 2008, he was named a Second Team College All-American and Big East Conference All-Star at third base, and Big East Conference Player of the Year. After the season, he was drafted by the Colorado Rockies in the fifth round of the 2008 Major League Baseball Draft, but he opted to return to Louisville for another season. In the summer of 2008, he returned to the CCBL to play for the Hyannis Mets, where he was named a league all-star, and made headlines by crushing three home runs in a single game, the first CCBL player to accomplish the feat since baseball hall of famer Frank Thomas did it twenty years earlier.

In 2009, he was named a First Team College All-American and Big East Conference All-Star third baseman and Big East Conference Player of the Year.

Professional career

San Francisco Giants
The San Francisco Giants selected Dominguez in the third round of the 2009 Major League Baseball Draft; he signed with the Giants. Dominguez made his professional debut with the Arizona Giants of the Rookie-level Arizona League and Salem Keizer Volcanoes of the Class-A Short Season Northwest League in 2010. He played for the Augusta GreenJackets of the Class-A South Atlantic League (SAL) in 2010, and he was named the SAL All-Star third baseman in 2010. In 2011, Dominguez began the season with the San Jose Giants of the Class-A Advanced California League, before he was promoted to the Richmond Flying Squirrels of the Class-AA Eastern League. He was invited to spring training in 2012.

Dominguez was called up to the majors for the first time on September 1, 2014. On September 21, 2014, Dominguez hit his first Major League home run off Ian Kennedy, accounting for the only runs of the game in an 8-2 loss to the San Diego Padres.

On February 4, 2015, Dominguez was released by the Giants.

Cincinnati Reds
On February 11, 2015, Dominguez signed a minor league contract that included an invitation to spring training with the Cincinnati Reds. He spent time with both the AAA Louisville Bats and the Reds that season. He elected free agency on November 6, 2015.

Boston Red Sox
On December 15, 2015, Dominguez signed a minor league contract with the Boston Red Sox that included an invite to spring training. He spent the entire season with Triple-A Pawtucket and became a free agent in November 2016.

Chicago Cubs
Dominguez signed a minor league contract with the Cubs on January 16, 2016, which includes an invite to spring training. He elected free agency on November 6, 2017.

Washington Nationals
On December 19, 2017, Dominguez signed a minor league contract with the Washington Nationals. He elected free agency on November 2, 2018, but later re-signed a minor league deal on March 14, 2019. Dominguez was released by the Nationals organization on May 25, 2019.

Coaching career
On June 13, 2022, Dominguez was named the head baseball coach of the Bellarmine Knights.

Head coaching record

References

External links

Living people
1986 births
Baseball players from Los Angeles
Sportspeople from Coral Gables, Florida
Major League Baseball third basemen
San Francisco Giants players
Cincinnati Reds players
Louisville Cardinals baseball players
Harwich Mariners players
Hyannis Harbor Hawks players
Arizona League Giants players
Salem-Keizer Volcanoes players
Augusta GreenJackets players
Leones de Ponce players
San Jose Giants players
Richmond Flying Squirrels players
Fresno Grizzlies players
Scottsdale Scorpions players
Louisville Bats players
Navegantes del Magallanes players
American expatriate baseball players in Venezuela
Pawtucket Red Sox players
Iowa Cubs players
Syracuse Chiefs players
Bellarmine Knights baseball coaches
Miami Hurricanes baseball coaches